Buclizine is an antihistamine and anticholinergic of the diphenylmethylpiperazine group. It is considered to be an antiemetic, similar to meclizine.

In the United Kingdom, buclizine is one of three drugs contained in Migraleve tablets, marketed by McNeil Healthcare for migraines.

References

Muscarinic antagonists
Chlorcyclizines
Tert-butyl compounds